Edmund Bartłomiejczyk (5 November 1885 – 2 September 1950) was a Polish painter. His work was part of the painting event in the art competition at the 1932 Summer Olympics.

References

1885 births
1950 deaths
20th-century Polish painters
20th-century Polish male artists
Olympic competitors in art competitions
Artists from Warsaw
Polish male painters